Riad Abdel-Magid Higazy (1919–1967) was an Egyptian earth scientist. The wrinkle ridge Dorsum Higazy on the Moon is named after him.

References

1819 births
1867 deaths
Egyptian geologists
20th-century geologists